Martyringa ussuriella is a moth in the family Lecithoceridae. It was described by Alexandr L. Lvovsky in 1979. It is found in Russia (Ussuri) and Japan.

References

Moths described in 1979
Martyringa
Moths of Asia
Moths of Japan